Andrew Morgan-Harrison (born 9 March 1998) is an English athlete specialising in the 200 metres.

He became British champion when winning the 200 metres event at the 2020 British Athletics Championships in a time of 20.69.

References

Living people
1998 births
English male sprinters
British male sprinters
British Athletics Championships winners
21st-century English people